Qualifying for the 2023 Rugby World Cup for Asia commenced in June 2022, with three teams competing for a spot in a Regional play-off match against Oceania 2.

Format
The Asia Rugby Championship, governed by Asia Rugby, is the regional qualification tournament for Rugby World Cup 2023, with only the leading Asian Championship league acting as the process. Three teams will participate across two matches, with the winner of the Asian Cup semi-final progressing to play the highest ranked participating team Hong Kong in the Asian Cup final. The winner of the final will advance to a Asia/Pacific play-off match against the winner of Oceania Round 3, Tonga (Oceania 2).

Originally planned for May 2021, the Championship was postponed due to health concerns related to the COVID-19 pandemic, and had been pushed back multiple more times to allow ample time for teams to participate safely owing COVID-19. This also meant multiple restructures of the competition from a round-robin format home and away to just a single round of fixtures played out of a neutral venue.

In April 2022, the format changed once again, following the withdrawal of Hong Kong, setting up a 2-match play-off between South Korea and Malaysia. However, on 29 April, Asia Rugby confirmed the final format for the competition which included Hong Kong back in the competition.

Entrants
Three teams will compete during for the Asian qualifiers for the 2023 Rugby World Cup, with Japan the only team thus far qualified from the Region.

Round 1: Asian Rugby Championship

Cup Semi-Final

Cup Final

References

External links
 Rugby World Cup Official Site

2023
Asia
2022 in Asian rugby union